Maidstone Invicta Rowing Club is a rowing club on the River Medway, based at Maidstone Rowing Centre, James Whatman Way, Maidstone, Kent.

History
The club was founded in 1984 and is affiliated to British Rowing. The club secured a 199-year lease from the Ministry of Defence on the site of the former Royal Engineers Rowing Club.

The club has produced multiple champions.

Honours

British champions

References

Sport in Kent
Rowing clubs in England
Maidstone